This article describes the group stage of the 2013–14 EHF Champions League.

Format
The 24 teams were split into four groups, consisting of six teams. Each team played a home and away game against all opponents in the group. The first four ranked teams advanced to the knockout stage.

Seedings
The draw for the group stage took place at the Gloriette in Vienna on 28 June 2013 at 20:15 local time. A total of 24 teams were drawn into four groups of six. Teams were divided into six pots, based on EHF coefficients. Clubs from the same pot or the same association could not be drawn into the same group, except the wild card tournament winner, which did not enjoy any protection.

Group A

Group B

Group C

Group D

References

External links
Official website

2013–14 EHF Champions League